Peters' trumpet-eared bat (Phoniscus jagorii) is a species of bat in the family Vespertilionidae, the vesper bats. It is native to Indonesia, Laos, Malaysia, Vietnam, and the Philippines. It was named by Peters for Fedor Jagor. It is also known as the common trumpet-eared bat.

References

Phoniscus
Bats of Southeast Asia
Bats of Indonesia
Bats of Malaysia
Mammals of Laos
Mammals of the Philippines
Least concern biota of Asia
Mammals described in 1866
Taxa named by Wilhelm Peters
Taxonomy articles created by Polbot